Anaphothrips is a genus of thrips belonging to the family Thripidae.

The genus was first described by Jindřich Uzel in 1895.

Species:
 Anaphothrips ambiguus (Girault, 1927)
 Anaphothrips astrolomi Pitkin, 1978
 Anaphothrips carlylei Girault, 1928
 Anaphothrips cecili Girault, 1928
 Anaphothrips cucurbiti Pitkin, 1978
 Anaphothrips dubius (Girault, 1926)
 Anaphothrips exocarpi Pitkin, 1978
 Anaphothrips incertus (Girault, 1929)
 Anaphothrips keatsi (Girault, 1926)
 Anaphothrips moundi Pitkin, 1978
 Anaphothrips newmani Moulton, 1935
 Anaphothrips obscurus (Müller, 1776)
 Anaphothrips occidentalis Pitkin, 1978
 Anaphothrips sudanensis Trybom, 1911
 Anaphothrips varii Moulton, 1935
 Anaphothrips woodi Pitkin, 1978
 Anaphothrips zealandicus Mound, 1978

References

Thripidae
Thrips genera
Taxa described in 1895